This is a list of lighthouses in Panama.

Lighthouses

See also
 Lists of lighthouses and lightvessels

References

External links
 

Panama
Lighthouses
Lighthouses